Bahjat al-Muhaisen (1927 – 10 April 2007) was a Royal Jordanian Land Force officer who served in significant infantry commands during his career.

Born in Tafilah, Jordan in 1927. Bahjat al-Muhaisen in 1966, was the Colonel in command of the Hettin Infantry Brigade stationed in the Hebron area. On 13 November 1966, an Israeli battalion commanded by Colonel Yoav Shaham broke through the Jordanian borders towards Samu village, allegedly to destroy a Fateh base that was active in the area. The Jordanians named the incident The Battle of Samu, though Israelis refer to it as Operation Shredder. Colonel Bahjat al-Muhaisen was injured in the battle, and Colonel Yoav Shaham was killed in action.

Seven months later still in command of his brigade, Bahjat participated in the 1967 Six-Day War without fighting and had to retreat to the East Bank of Jordan. His brigade was the last one to cross the River Jordan on Wednesday 7 June 1967 before destroying the bridges. Hebron was captured that day at 18:00. A little less than a year later, he saw action again in Battle of Karameh. That day ended decisively in favor of the Jordanian army.

Bahjat was transferred to the command of Al Hussain bin Ali Brigade as a Brigadier General in the South of Jordan then he was appointed as Military Attache at the Embassy of HKJ. He was there for less than a year, when he was recalled back to Jordan. He was handed the command of the Second Division of the Jordanian Army based in the northern part of Jordan. The unfortunate events of what became known later as Black September, had started and there was an urgent need to enforce order and peace. During this time, Bahjat AL Muhaisen had met with a number of developments which led him to submit his resignation in 1971. These developments included unclarity in the Military hierarchy within the Second Division epitomized by the inter-linking and the contradictory orders issued by GHQ which went straight to those under AL Muhaisen rather than through him. A number of Political & Military leaders were working towards escalating the situation with the Palestinian factions & creating a state of unrest . Al Muhaisen was left with no choice but to submit his resignation and move with his family to his hometown of Tafila. He died in Amman, Jordan on 10 April 2007.

References

1927 births
2007 deaths
Jordanian generals
History of Palestine (region)
Jordanian diplomats